Pulliman may refer to:

Pulliman (1972 film), Malayalam film released in 1972 starring Madhu and Devika
Pulliman (2010 film), Malayalam film released in 2010 starring Kalabhavan Mani and Meera Nandan